The Oklahoma City Blue are an American professional basketball team in the NBA G League based in Oklahoma City, Oklahoma, and are affiliated with the Oklahoma City Thunder. The Blue play their home games at Paycom Center. The franchise began as the Asheville Altitude in 2001, before moving to Tulsa, Oklahoma, in 2005 and becoming the Tulsa 66ers. After nine seasons in Tulsa, the franchise moved to Oklahoma City in 2014 and were subsequently renamed the Oklahoma City Blue.

Franchise history

Asheville Altitude (2001-2005)
The Asheville Altitude were a founding team of the National Basketball Development League (NBDL) in 2001. They played at the Asheville Civic Center in Asheville, North Carolina, where they won back-to-back championships in 2004 and 2005.

Tulsa 66ers (2005-2014)
Southwest Basketball, LLC, headed by former Indiana Pacers general manager David Kahn, was awarded four National Basketball Development League franchises in March 2005. One of the Southwest Basketball franchises was for Tulsa. The Tulsa team agreed to play for three years at the Expo Square Pavilion. Instead of the announced new franchise, the company purchased the Asheville Altitude in May 2005 and moved them to Tulsa. Southwest had a name-the-team contest, which had 1,200 entries, with the winning name, the 66ers, announced on July 29, 2005. The 66ers name comes from U.S. Route 66, which runs through state of Oklahoma and Tulsa, less than a mile north of Expo Square Pavilion. On August 2, 2005, the team named Joey Meyer as the team's first head coach. For their inaugural season and under a new affiliation system, the 66ers were directly affiliated with four NBA teams: the Chicago Bulls, Indiana Pacers, Milwaukee Bucks and New Orleans Hornets.

For its second season, 2006–07, the team's assigned NBA affiliated teams the Bulls and the Pacers were dropped while the New York Knicks were added. Local businessman Jono Helmerich's group purchased a 20% stake in the franchise from Southwest Basketball, while Helmerich was named team president on February 5, 2007. For the 2007–08 season, the Dallas Mavericks joined as the 66ers NBA affiliates while the Hornets were dropped.

The 66ers indicated on February 12, 2008, that for the 2008–09 season that the team would start playing at the new SpiritBank Event Center in the suburb of Bixby. The Seattle SuperSonics and the Bucks were assigned on June 12, 2008, as NBA affiliates for the 2008–09 season. On July 31, 2008, the 66ers announced that Professional Basketball Club LLC, owner of the Oklahoma City Thunder (formally the Seattle SuperSonics), had purchased the 66ers, marking the third D-League team to be owned by an NBA team (the first two were the Los Angeles D-Fenders and the Austin Toros, owned by the Los Angeles Lakers and San Antonio Spurs, respectively).

The one-season relationship with the arena ended with a lawsuit regarding more than $100,000 the team claimed it was owed. The 66ers filed a lawsuit seeking more than $200,000 in compensatory damages from SpiritBank Center's ownership group. The team subsequently moved to the Tulsa Convention Center in downtown Tulsa for the 2009–10 season.

In April 2010, the Tulsa 66ers reached the playoffs for the first time. The team won two postseason series to reach the D-League finals. Facing the Rio Grande Valley Vipers, the team lose the final by zero games to two games.

For the 2010–11 season, the 66ers coached by Nate Tibbetts set a team record of 33–17 while also having a 14-game winning streak. In the playoff, the team reached the semifinals and faced off with Iowa before losing the series 0–2.

In May 2012, the 66ers announced that they would return to the SpiritBank Event Center for the 2012–13 season. Before September 2013 when the OKC Thunder add the station to its Thunder Radio Network, KAKC 1300 AM was already the 66ers' radio broadcasting partner. Making the playoffs again, Tulsa won a first round series against Canton but was swept again in the semi-final this time by Rio Grande Valley.

However, in June 2014, SpiritBank announced that it would no longer seek bookings or lease the arena space.  The 66ers played its last game at Sioux Falls for a 107–105 loss on April 5, 2014. The team finished 24-26 just short of making the playoffs.

Oklahoma City Blue (2014-present)
After getting offers from four venues, Professional Basketball Club felt none were suitable and announced the 66ers would move to Oklahoma City and play in the Cox Convention Center across the street from the Chesapeake Energy Arena where the parent club Oklahoma City Thunder plays starting with the 2014–15 season. The team's front offices are located in the Chesapeake Energy Arena along with the rest of the front office staff of the parent club Oklahoma City Thunder. With the move, the team was rebranded from the 66ers to the Blue. In the 2016–17 season, the team was the regular season Western Conference champion with 34 wins, a franchise record.

In 2021, the Cox Convention Center was leased to a film production company and the arena was closed to become Prairie Surf Studios. The Blue then moved into their parent team's home arena, the Paycom Center (then recently renamed from Chesapeake Energy Arena) in 2021.

Season-by-season record

Players

Current roster

Notable NBA players with experience

 Alex Caruso (2016-17) Caruso joined the Blue in 2016 and later signed a two-way contract with the Los Angeles Lakers in 2017. Caruso eventually signed a multi-year contract with the Lakers and won his first NBA championship in 2019.
 Shaun Livingston (2009) Livingston joined the 66ers in 2009 and was later signed by the Thunder to a multi-year contract three weeks later. Livingston played for nine different NBA teams with his best performance coming with the Golden State Warriors. As a member of the Warriors, Livingston won three NBA championships.
Names in bold indicate those who played for the Oklahoma City Thunder.

Notable NBA players assigned

 Reggie Jackson (2012) Jackson was assigned to the 66ers starting in 2012 by the Thunder. Jackson will later go on to become the Thunder's sixth man during the 2013-14 season, finishing fifth in Sixth Man of the Year voting. After being traded by the Thunder, Jackson developed into a starter for the Detroit Pistons and the LA Clippers.
 Cameron Payne (2015-17) Payne was assigned to the Blue starting in 2015 by the Thunder. Payne eventually found a role with the Phoenix Suns as a role player starting in 2019.
 André Roberson (2013-14) Roberson was assigned to the 66ers starting in 2013 by the Thunder. Roberson will later go on to start for four seasons with the Thunder which included an NBA All-Defensive Second Team honor in 2017.

Two-way players

 Moses Brown (2020-21) Brown signed a two-way contract with the Thunder prior to the start of the 2020-21 season. During the season, Brown was named All-NBA G League First Team with season averages of 18.5 points, 13.9 rebounds and 1.9 blocks. Brown had a career high 21 points and 23 rebounds against the Boston Celtics with the rebounds tying a team record. Brown will later re-sign with the Thunder on a multi-year contract following the season.
 Luguentz Dort (2019-20) Dort went undrafted out of Arizona State signing a two-way contract with the Thunder prior to the start of the 2019-20 season. During the 2020 NBA Playoffs, Dort was lauded for his defense on James Harden including a 30-point performance in game 7 against the Houston Rockets. Dort will later re-sign with the Thunder on a multi-year contract following the season.
 Aaron Wiggins (2021-22) Wiggins was drafted 55th overall out of Maryland signing a two-way contract with the Thunder prior to the start of the 2021-22 season. During a seven game stretch in December, Wiggins averaged 15.3 points, 5.6 rebounds and 1.1 steals on 53.8% shooting in 31.8 minutes. Wiggins will later convert his two-way into a multi-year contract with the Thunder during the season.
Names in bold indicate current two-way players for the Oklahoma City Thunder.

Head coaches

NBA affiliates

Asheville Altitude
None

Tulsa 66ers
Chicago Bulls (2005–2006)
Dallas Mavericks (2007–2008)
Indiana Pacers (2005–2006)
Milwaukee Bucks (2005–2008)
New Orleans Hornets (2005–2007)
New York Knicks (2006–2008)
Oklahoma City Thunder (2008–2014)

Oklahoma City Blue
Oklahoma City Thunder (2014–present)

References

External links
Official website

 
Bkue
Basketball teams established in 2001
Basketball teams in Oklahoma
2001 establishments in North Carolina
Basketball teams in North Carolina